Coro is the debut studio album by the Latin freestyle singer Coro. It was released on March 5, 1991, by Charisma Records.

Track listing

Charts
Singles - Billboard (North America)

References

1991 albums
Coro (singer) albums